Upper Bann may refer to:

Upper Bann (Assembly constituency), a constituency in the Northern Ireland Assembly
Upper Bann (UK Parliament constituency), a parliamentary constituency in the United Kingdom House of Commons